Two United States Navy destroyers have been named in honor of Thomas Claxton.

 The second  served during World War II.

References

United States Navy ship names